Ordinary People is a 2018 novel by Diana Evans.

The book received positive reviews from The Guardian and The New Yorker. It was shortlisted for the 2019 Women's Prize for Fiction.

References

2018 British novels
Chatto & Windus books